
This is a list of airports in São Tomé and Príncipe, sorted by location.

São Tomé and Príncipe, officially the Democratic Republic of São Tomé and Príncipe, is a Portuguese-speaking island nation in the Gulf of Guinea, off the western equatorial coast of Africa. São Tomé and Príncipe are located between the islands of Annobón and Bioko, both part of Equatorial Guinea. The nation is divided into seven districts, six on São Tomé and one on Príncipe. Its capital is the city of São Tomé.

Airports

See also 

 Transport in São Tomé and Príncipe
 List of airports by ICAO code: F#FP - São Tomé and Príncipe
 Wikipedia: WikiProject Aviation/Airline destination lists: Africa#São Tomé and Príncipe

References 
 
  - includes IATA codes
 Great Circle Mapper: Airports in São Tomé and Príncipe - IATA and ICAO codes, coordinates
 World Aero Data: Airports in São Tomé and Príncipe - ICAO codes and coordinates

São Tomé and Príncipe
 
Airports
Airports
Sao Tome and Principe